Ilojo Bar, also called Olaiya House or Casa da Fernandez, was a Brazilian-styled historic building located near Tinubu Square in Lagos Island, Lagos State, Nigeria. It was originally built as a bar and restaurant in 1855 by the Fernandez family who employed returning ex-slaves who had mastered the art of building while in South America. Ilojo Bar was subsequently sold to Alfred Omolana Olaiya of the Olaiya family in 1933 and was declared a national monument in 1956 by the National Commission for Museums and Monuments.

The name "Ilojo Bar" 
After the house was sold to Alfred Omolona Olaiya in 1933, he renamed the building "Ilojo Bar" after his hometown of "Ilojo" in Ijesa Isu, Ekiti State.

Demolition
The building was pulled down on Sunday, 11 September 2016, in suspicious circumstances during the Eid weekend in Lagos. The matter is still being investigated. The land is now under the control of the Lagos State Government.

References

Afro-Brazilian architecture
Brazilian Nigerian
Demolished buildings and structures in Lagos
Lagos Island
Landmarks in Lagos
1855 establishments in Africa
History of Lagos
Companies based in Lagos
Drinking establishments in Nigeria
Food and drink companies of Nigeria
19th-century establishments in Lagos
Restaurants in Lagos
Restaurants established in 1855
Historic buildings and structures in Nigeria
Buildings and structures demolished in 2016